Bare Stripped Naked is the seventh studio album by Dutch indie rock band Bettie Serveert.

Track listing
"Roadmovies" – 4:34
"Hell = Other People" – 3:38
"Love & Learn" – 2:34
"Brain-tag" – 3:03
"Storm" – 3:18
"The Rope" – 3:17
"All The Other Fish" – 3:29
"What They Call Love" – 3:12
"Painted Word" – 2:18
"2nd Time" – 3:37
"Hell = Other People"  (alternative version) – 3:51
"Certainlie" – 5:49

Personnel
Carol Van Dyk – vocals, guitar
Peter Visser – guitar
Herman Bunskoeke – bass guitar
Martijn Blankestijn – keyboards
Gino Geudens – drums, vocals
Henk Jonkers – drums 'Storm'
René van Barneveld – electric guitar 'Roadmovies'
Yvonne v.d. Pol – strings 'All The Other Fish'

Bonus DVD
The album is released with a bonus DVD, containing a concert in Brussels.

References

Bettie Serveert albums
2006 albums